The Taitung Chinese Association is an assembly hall in Taitung City, Taitung County, Taiwan.

History
The association building was built in 1927 during the Japanese rule of Taiwan as the means for the Overseas Chinese to gather and assemble due to the fact that Taiwan was not part of China at that time. During the Second Sino-Japanese War in 1937, the Japanese government launched the Japanization towards the Chinese people in Taiwan, which also resulted in the eviction of the association from the building in 1938. In 1938-1945, the building was used by the Xinmin Society, a pro-Japanese organization based in Peking. After the handover of Taiwan from Japan to the Republic of China in 1945, the society was disbanded. The building was left unused until it was finally restored to its current condition and opened during the Retrocession Day commemoration in 1986.

References

1927 establishments in Taiwan
Buildings and structures completed in 1927
Buildings and structures in Taitung County